The Second Yamamoto Cabinet is the 22nd Cabinet of Japan led by Katō Tomosaburō from September 2, 1923 to January 7, 1924.

Cabinet

References 

Cabinet of Japan
1923 establishments in Japan
Cabinets established in 1923
Cabinets disestablished in 1924